Virtual Murder may refer to:
 Virtual Murder (TV series), a 1992 investigative drama series
 Virtual Murder (video game series), a murder-mystery adventure video game series